Lambertia rariflora, commonly known as green honeysuckle, is a shrub which is endemic to the south-west of Western Australia.

The species was formally described in 1848 by botanist Carl Meisner.

References

Eudicots of Western Australia
rariflora
Endemic flora of Southwest Australia